Tatiana Salem Levy (born January 24, 1979 Lisbon) is a Brazilian writer and translator.

Early life and education
Levy's parents are Turkish Jews established in Portugal during the Brazilian military government.

She studied literature at the Federal University of Rio de Janeiro and the Pontifical Catholic University of Rio de Janeiro.

She lives in Rio de Janeiro as of 2012.

Honors and awards
2008 São Paulo Prize for Literature — Winner in the Best Book of the Year - Debut Author category for A Chave de Casa
2012 São Paulo Prize for Literature — Shortlisted in the Best Book of the Year category for Dois Rios
 2012 Granta Best of Young Brazilian Novelists
 Finalista Prêmio Jabuti.

Works
 Antologías:Paralelos (2004), 25 Mulheres que Estão Fazendo a Nova Literatura Brasileira (2005), Recontando Machado (2008),  Dicionário Amoroso da Língua Portuguesa (2009).
 A Experiência de Fora: Blanchot, Foucault e Deleuze, Relume Dumará, (2003).
 A Chave de Casa (2007)
 Primos (2010) Editora Record.
 Em Silêncio (2011) Record para 2011.
 Dois Rios (2011) (Editora Record)
 Vista Chinesa (2021) (Editora Todavia)

References

1979 births
Living people
Brazilian women writers
Brazilian writers
Brazilian people of Turkish-Jewish descent
Jewish Brazilian writers
Jewish women writers
Writers from Rio de Janeiro (city)
Pontifical Catholic University of Rio de Janeiro alumni
Portuguese emigrants to Brazil
Jewish Portuguese writers